"Dog Star" is a 1962 science fiction short story by British writer Arthur C. Clarke about an astronomer and his dog, Laika. The story was also published under the title "Moondog".

Plot summary
An Astronomer on a Moon base awakes from a dream in which his dog, Laika, is barking. All we know at this point is that the narrator is feeling a sense of dread enough to keep him awake. And then mentions that if he had gone back to sleep he would've been dead. He quickly flashes back to when he found Laika on the side of the road years ago, and how his fondness for her grew after she alerted him of an earthquake, saving his life. When it was time for him to leave Earth and continue his studies on the Moon, he gave up Laika to a fellow employee Dr. Anderson. He comes out of the flashback just in time to sound the alert for a lunar tremor that, thanks to his prompt action, kills only two of his fellow crew members. He remembers his dead dog, realizing that Laika could not actually have saved him, for she was separated by 5 years time and a barrier that no man or dog could ever bridge (her death). It was his never sleeping subconscious mind, sensing the tremors, that knew how to wake him, by making him dream of Laika's barking as she did in the earlier earthquake. Thus ending on the idea of the supernatural bond between the narrator and Laika.

References

External links 
 
 "Moon Dog" on the Internet Archive

1962 short stories
Short stories by Arthur C. Clarke
Short stories set on the Moon
Works originally published in Galaxy Science Fiction
Short stories about dogs